Alberto Machaze (born 30 November 1964) is a Mozambican boxer. He competed in the men's bantamweight event at the 1988 Summer Olympics.

References

External links
 

1964 births
Living people
Mozambican male boxers
Olympic boxers of Mozambique
Boxers at the 1988 Summer Olympics
Place of birth missing (living people)
Bantamweight boxers